Elmer Ellsworth Cleveland (September 15, 1862 – October 8, 1913) was an American third baseman in Major League Baseball. He began his professional career in the Western Interstate League in 1883 and then joined the Cincinnati Outlaw Reds of the Union Association in 1884. He played in 29 games with the Reds and hit .322.

From 1885 to 1887, he was back in the minors in the Southern League and Northwestern League. He returned to the majors in 1888 with the New York Giants and Pittsburgh Alleghenys of the National League.

After two seasons with Omaha of the Western Association, he played in the American Association with the Columbus Solons. He ended his career in the Pennsylvania State League in 1892.

External links

1862 births
1913 deaths
19th-century baseball players
Major League Baseball third basemen
Cincinnati Outlaw Reds players
New York Giants (NL) players
Pittsburgh Alleghenys players
Columbus Solons players
Johnstown (minor league baseball) players
Oil City (minor league baseball) players
Atlanta Atlantas players
St. Paul Freezers players
St. Paul Saints (Northwestern League) players
Omaha Omahogs players
Omaha Lambs players
Troy Trojans (minor league) players
Johnstown Pirates players
Danville (minor league baseball) players
Minor league baseball managers